The Defence Food Research Laboratory (DFRL) is an Indian defence laboratory of the Defence Research and Development Organisation (DRDO). Located in Mysore, Karnataka, it conducts research and development of technologies and products in the area of food science and technology to cater the varied food challenges for the Indian Armed Forces. DFRL is organised under the Life Sciences Directorate of DRDO. The present director of DFRL is Dr. A D Semwal.

History
"The Defence Food Research Laboratory (DFRL) came into being on 28th December 1961 under the aegis of Defence Research and Development Organisation (DRDO), Ministry of Defence, Government of India, at  Mysore especially to cater to the varied food challenges of Indian Army, Navy, Airforce and other paramilitary forces."

Areas of work
Research and development in food science and technology
Studies in the development of convenience foods, preservation of foods, food safety, food packaging, and studies in the spoilage of foods and safety of processed foods
Production and supply of processed foods on a limited scale to the Armed Forces and other bodies for national missions
Toxicological, nutritional, and biochemical studies
Development of pack rations, their quality assurance methods
Preservation and packaging methods for long-distance transportation of perishable products
Evaluation of nutritional requirements of troops deployed under different climatic conditions

The Laboratory has testing facilities and  analytical instruments such as GC, GCMS, GLC, HPLC, Nanodrop spectrophotometer, Atomic Absorption Spectrophotometer, Lovibond Tintometer, etc. Animal house enables nutritional and safety evaluation of a variety of foods. Some of the recent additions to the processing equipments include, High pressure processing, Pulsed electric field processing, Khoa making machine, controlled atmosphere system, integrated soya paneer plant, blast freezer and plate freezer lyophilizer, polymer twin screw extruders. Food Scanner, Texturometer, Hydrosorb, Hybridization oven, Image analyser, Thermogravimetric Analyser, Differential scanning colorimeter, Dynamic mechanical analyser, Alveoconsisto graph, Cell counter, Gradient thermal cycler, Scanning electron microscope, FPHLC, Gel Documentation system, IR Spectroscope and Atomic Force microscope.

The Laboratory has developed some analytical test kits for evaluation of deteriorative changes in food such as Meat Testing Kit, Test Kit for E.coli detection, Presumptive Test Kit for Coliform Detection, Acidity Testing Paper Strip, Pesticide detection kit.

Projects and products

Technologies for civilian use
Many of the DFRL foods, born out of innovative state-of-the-art technologies, lend themselves eminently suitable to industrial scale commercial exploitation by enterprising entrepreneurs of different genre. Some of the technologies that have been transferred to entrepreneurs are:
Retort processing in flexible pouches
Mini combo pack ration
Freeze dried foods
Preservation of tender coconut water
Preserved and flavoured chapaties
Instant/Quick cooking foods
Puff and serve chapaties
Short term preserved chapaties
Scrambled egg mix
Combo pack ration
Supplementary compo pack ration
Cold stock drying technology
Instant choley mix technology
Minimally processed pre-cut vegetables
Ethylene absorbed pad/scrubber development
IM/HT fruits

See also
Harsh Vardhan Batra

References

External links
Defence Food Research Laboratory website

1961 establishments in Mysore State
Government agencies established in 1961
Defence Research and Development Organisation laboratories
Food science institutes
Research and development in India
Research institutes in Mysore
Research institutes established in 1961
Food and drink in India